Stevia is a genus of about 240 species of herbs and shrubs in the family Asteraceae, native to subtropical and tropical regions from western North America to South America.

The species Stevia rebaudiana is widely grown for the sweet compounds (steviol glycosides) extracted from its leaves, sold as a sugar substitute under the generic name stevia and several trade names.

Taxonomy
The genus Stevia consists of 240 species of plants native to South America, Central America, and Mexico, with several species found as far north as Arizona, New Mexico, and Texas. Human use of the sweet species S. rebaudiana originated in South America.

The genus was named for Spanish botanist and physician Petrus Jacobus Stevus (Pedro Jaime Esteve 1500–1556), a professor of botany at the University of Valencia.

References

External links

 
Herbs
Medicinal plants
Sugar substitutes
Asteraceae genera
Taxa named by Antonio José Cavanilles